McGlusky the Sea Rover is a 1935 British comedy action film directed by Walter Summers and starring Jack Doyle, Tamara Desni and Henry Mollison. It was based on a novel by A.G. Hales. It featured the Arklow schooner Mary B Mitchell. The film was released in the U.S. as Hell's Cargo.

Plot summary
A stowaway becomes mixed up with gunrunners.

Cast
 Jack Doyle as McGlusky
 Tamara Desni as Flame
 Henry Mollison as Captain Mazarin
 Cecil Ramage as Auda
 Frank Cochrane as Abu
 Hugh Miller as Karim
 Jack Short as Govan

References

Bibliography
Wood, Linda. British Films, 1927–1939. British Film Institute, 1986.

External links

1935 films
1930s adventure comedy films
Films shot at British International Pictures Studios
1930s English-language films
Films directed by Walter Summers
British adventure comedy films
Seafaring films
British black-and-white films
1935 comedy films
1930s British films